Mahdi Abduljabbar Mahdi Darwish Hassan (born 25 June 1991)  is a Bahraini footballer who currently plays for Manama and Bahrain national team as a striker.

Career

Club career

International career
He made his debut for Bahrain national football team on 9 May 2017 against Chinese Taipei as part of the 2019 AFC Asian Cup qualification.

International goals
Scores and results list Bahrain's goal tally first.

Honours

Club
Al-Riffa
 Bahraini Premier League: 2018–19
 Bahraini King's Cup: 2018–19

Individual
 Bahraini Premier League top scorer: 2020–21

References

External links
National Football Teams profile
Kooora profile

Bahraini footballers
1991 births
Living people
Bahrain international footballers
Sportspeople from Manama
Association football forwards
Riffa SC players
Manama Club players